The Kashmiri Pandits (also known as Kashmiri Brahmins) are a group of Kashmiri Hindus and a part of the larger Saraswat Brahmin community of India. They belong to the Pancha Gauda Brahmin group from the Kashmir Valley, a mountainous region located within the Indian union territory of Jammu and Kashmir.
Kashmiri Pandits are Hindu Kashmiris native to the Kashmir Valley, and the only remaining Hindu Kashmiris after the large-scale of conversion of the Valley's population to Islam during the medieval times. Prompted by the growth of Islamic militancy in the valley, large numbers left in the exodus of the 1990s. Even so, small numbers remain.

History

Early history

The Hindu caste system of the Kashmir region was influenced by the influx of Buddhism from the time of Asoka, around the third century BCE, and a consequence of this was that the traditional lines of varna were blurred, with the exception of that for the Brahmins. Another notable feature of early Kashmiri society was the relative high regard in which women were held when compared to their position in other communities of the period.

A historically contested region, Northern India was subject to attack from Turkic and Arab regimes from the eighth century onwards, but they generally ignored the mountain-circled Kashmir Valley in favour of easier pickings elsewhere. It was not until the fourteenth century that Muslim rule was finally established in the Valley and when this happened it did not occur primarily as a consequence of invasion so much as because of internal problems resulting from the weak rule and corruption endemic in the Hindu Lohara dynasty. Mohibbul Hasan describes this collapse as 

The Brahmins had something to be particularly unhappy about during the reign of the last Lohara king, for Sūhadeva chose to include them in his system of onerous taxation, whereas previously they appear to have been exempted.

Medieval history
Zulju, who was probably a Mongol from Turkistan, wreaked devastation in 1320, when he commanded a force that conquered many regions of the Kashmir Valley. However, Zulju was probably not a Muslim. The actions of Sultan Sikandar Butshikan (1389–1413), the seventh Muslim ruler in Kashmir were also significant to the area. The Sultan has been referred to as an iconoclast because of his destruction of many non-Muslim religious symbols and the manner in which he forced the population to convert or flee. Many followers of the traditional religions who did not convert to Islam instead migrated to other parts of India. The migrants included some Pandits, although it is possible that some of this community relocated for economic reasons as much as to escape the new rulers. Brahmins were at that time generally being offered grants of land in other areas by rulers seeking to utilise the traditionally high literacy and general education of the community, as well as the legitimacy conferred upon them by association. The outcome of this shift both in population and in religion was that the Kashmir Valley became a predominantly Muslim region. It was during the 14th century that the Kashmiri Pandits likely split into their three subcastes: Guru/Bāchabat (priests), Jotish (astrologers), and Kārkun (who were historically mainly employed by the government). The majority of Kashmiri Brahmins are Kārkuns, and this is likely due to the conversion of the majority of Kashmiris to Islam, which led to a decrease in demand for Hindu priests, which led most Kashmiri Brahmins to seek secular employment.

Butshikan's heir, the devout Muslim Zain-ul-Abidin (1423–74), was tolerant of Hindus to the extent of sanctioning a return to Hinduism of those who had been forcibly converted to the Muslim faith, as well as becoming involved in the restoration of temples. He respected the learning of these Pandits, to whom he gave land as well as encouraging those who had left to return. He operated a meritocracy and both Brahmins and Buddhists were among his closest advisors.

Modern history

Early modern

Modern
D.L. Sheth, the former director of the Center for the Study of Developing Societies in India (CSDS), lists Indian communities that constituted the middle class and were traditionally "Urban and professional" (following professions like doctors, lawyers, teachers, engineers, etc.) immediately after Independence in 1947. This list included the Kashmiri Pandits, the Nagar Brahmins from Gujarat; the South Indian Brahmins; the Punjabi Khatris, and Kayasthas from northern India; Chitpawans and CKPs (Chandraseniya Kayastha Prabhus) from Maharashtra; the Probasi and the Bhadralok Bengalis; the Parsis and the upper crusts of Muslim and Christian communities. According to P.K.Verma, "Education was a common thread that bound together this pan Indian elite" and almost all the members of these communities could read and write English and were educated beyond school.

Recent events

Exodus from Kashmir (1989–1995)

The Kashmiri Pandits had been a favoured section of the population of the valley during Dogra rule (1846–1947). 20 per cent of them left the valley as a consequence of the 1950 land reforms, and by 1981 the Pandit population amounted to 5 per cent of the total.

They began to leave in much greater numbers in the 1990s during the eruption of militancy, following persecution and threats by radical Islamists and militants. The events of 19 January 1990 were particularly vicious. On that day, mosques issued declarations that the Kashmiri Pandits were Kafirs and that the males had to leave Kashmir, convert to Islam or be killed. Those who chose to the first of these were told to leave their women behind. The Kashmiri Muslims were instructed to identify Pandit homes so they could be systematically targeted for conversion or killing.

According to a number of authors, approximately 100,000 of the total Kashmiri Pandit population of 140,000 left the valley during the 1990s. Other authors have suggested a higher figure for the exodus, ranging from the entire population of over 150,000, to 190,000 of a total Pandit population of 200,000, to a number as high as 800,000. The nature of the planned exodus has remain controversial, with the involvement of then Governor Jagmohan in organising a clandestine exodus been a subject of controversy. Many of the refugee Kashmiri Pandits have been living in abject conditions in refugee camps of Jammu. The government has reported on the terrorist threats to Pandits still living in the Kashmir region.

Some Hindus across India tried to help the Pandits. Bal Thackeray from Maharashtra got seats reserved in engineering colleges for the children of these Pandits. He was one of the first persons to help them after which Punjab also followed suit.

In 2009 the Oregon Legislative Assembly passed a resolution to recognise 14 September 2007, as Martyrs Day to acknowledge ethnic cleansing and campaigns of terror inflicted on non-Muslim minorities of Jammu and Kashmir by terrorists seeking to establish an Islamic state.

In 2010, the Government of Jammu and Kashmir noted that 808 Pandit families, comprising 3,445 people, were still living in the Valley and that financial and other incentives put in place to encourage others to return there had been unsuccessful. According to a J&K government report, 219 members of the community had been killed in the region between 1989 and 2004 but none thereafter. The local organisation of pandits in Kashmir, Kashmir Pandit Sangharsh Samiti after carrying out a survey in 2008 and 2009, said that 399 Kashmiri Pandits were killed by insurgents from 1990 to 2011 with 75% of them being killed during the first year of the Kashmiri insurgency.

The exiled community had hoped to return after the situation improved. They have not done so because the situation in the Valley remains unstable and they fear a risk to their lives.

As of October 2015, only 1 Kashmiri Pandit family returned to the Kashmir valley since 1990 according to the Jammu & Kashmir government despite the financial assistance being given for rehabilitation. As of 2016, a total of 1,800 Kashmiri Pandit youths have returned to the valley since the announcing of Rs. 1,168-crore package in 2008 by the UPA government.

PRC and the JKMIP Acts

There are zones set up with offices for relief. Many Orders, Circulars and recommendations have been issued for relief of Kashmiri Pandits.

The Jammu And Kashmir Migrant Immovable Property (Preservation, Protection And Restraint on Distress Sales) Act, 1997, provides that "Any person who is an unauthorised occupant or recipient of any usufruct of any immovable property of the migrant shall pay to the migrant such compensation for the period of unauthorised occupation and in such a manner as may be determined by the District Magistrate."

Socio-political organisations

Following the migration of the Kashmiri Pandit community, various socio-political organisations have sprung up to represent the cause of the displaced community. The most prominent among these are the All India Kashmiri Samaj or AIKS, All India Kashmiri Pandit conference, Panun Kashmir & Kashmiri Samiti. These organisations are involved in rehabilitation of the community in the valley through peace negotiations, mobilisation of human rights groups and job creation for the Pandits.

Panun Kashmir has made demands for a separate homeland for the community in the southern part of Kashmir. Ikkjutt Jammu, a political party in Jammu and Kashmir, advocates for two Union Territories in Kashmir, one being Panun Kashmir for Kashmiri Hindus.

Population distribution

According to the 1941 census, there were 78,800 Kashmiri Pandits in the Kashmir Valley. They were distributed into the two districts of Valley, the Baramulla district, where Hindus constituted 2.1 percent of the population; 12,919 Hindus out of 612,428 total. and the Anantnag district, where they were 7.84 percent of the population.

Scholar Christopher Snedden states that the Pandits made up about 6 per cent of the Kashmir Valley's population in 1947.  By 1950, their population declined to 5 per cent as many Pandits moved to other parts of India due to the uncompensated land redistribution policy, the unsettled nature of Kashmir's accession to India and the threat of economic and social decline.

In the 1981 census, the Kashmir Division had 124,078 Hindus, the majority of whom were Pandits. Scholar Alexander Evans estimates by 1990, there would have been 160,000–170,000 Pandits in the Kashmir Valley.

Following the 1989 insurgency, a great majority of Pandits felt threatened and left the Kashmir Valley for other parts of India. A large number settled in the Jammu Division of the State and the National Capital Region of India. Some emigrated to other countries entirely.
By 2011, only an estimated 2,700-3,400 Pandits remained in the Kashmir Valley.

According to Indian government, more than 60,000 families are registered as Kashmiri migrants including some Sikh and Muslim families. Most families were resettled in Jammu, NCR and other neighbouring states.

Society and culture

Religious beliefs

Kashmir has also been a land of Sun worship with shrines such as Martand Sun Temple established by Lalitaditya Muktapida. Sun worship is believed to have been brought into Kashmir by Kushan kings from Iran. Lalitaditya's predecessor, Ranaditya, is said to have built the first sun temple. Wanvun singing is an integral part of Kashmiri Pandit religious ceremonies.

Pilgrimage sites

Harmukh is traditionally revered by Kashmiri Pandits and in 2009 there was an attempt by them to revive pilgrimages to the site. The Mata Kheerbhawani temple shrine in Srinagar, considered one of the holiest Hindu shrines, saw the largest gathering of Kashmiri Pandits in the Kashmir valley in 2012. The shrine is located in Tullamulla village, 24 km from Srinagar in Ganderbal district.

Festivals

The Kashmiri Pandits festivals include Shivratri (or Herath in the Kashmiri language) which is one of the major festivals of Kashmiri Pandits. Navreh or the Kashmiri lunar new year is also an important Pandit festival.

Culture

Dress
Kshemendra's detailed records from the eleventh century describe many items of which the precise nature is unknown. It is clear that tunics known as kanchuka were worn long-sleeved by men and in both long- and half-sleeved versions by women. Caps were worn, as well as a type of turban referred to as a shirahshata, while footwear consisted of leather shoes and boots, worn with socks. Some items were elaborate, such as the peacock shoes – known as mayuropanah – worn by followers of fashion, and steel-soled shoes adorned with floral designs, lubricated internally with beeswax. They also wear the mekhalā, which is a type of girdle.

There are many references to the wearing of jewellery by both sexes, but a significant omission from them is any record of the dejihor worn on the ear by women today as a symbol of their being married. Kaw has speculated that this item of jewellery may not have existed at the time. The texts also refer to both sexes using cosmetics, and to the women adopting elaborate hairstyles. Men, too, might adopt stylish arrangements and wear flowers in their hair, if they had the financial means to do so.

Music
Henzae is an ancient traditional form of singing practised by Kashmiri Pandits at their festivals. It appears to have archaic features that suggest it is the oldest form of Kashmiri folk singing.

Diet
The Kashmiri Pandits have a tradition of consuming meat, including mutton and fish, but they obey restrictions laid down by the shastras of not eating the meat of forbidden animals such as beef and pork. Frederick J. Simoons says that according to some reports, Kashmiri Pandits also consume fish as part of their diet.

Subcastes 
The Kashmiri Pandits are divided into three subcastes: Guru/Bāchabat (priests), Jotish (astrologers), and Kārkun (who were historically mainly employed by the government). All three subcastes interdine and interteach, but only the Jotish and Kārkun subcastes intermarry.

Notable Kashmiri Pandits
 Motilal Nehru, lawyer and leader of Indian National Congress
 Jawaharlal Nehru, former Prime Minister of India
 Indira Gandhi, former Prime Minister of India
 Vijaya Lakshmi Pandit, politician and diplomat
 P. N. Haksar, bureaucrat and diplomat
 Tej Bahadur Sapru, freedom fighter, lawyer, and politician
Tapishwar Narain Raina, ninth Chief of the Army Staff of Indian Army
 Sanjiv Bhatt, Indian Police Service officer of the Gujarat-cadre
 Raaj Kumar, actor
 Anupam Kher, actor 
 Raju Kher, actor and director
Kunal Khemu, actor
 Puru Raaj Kumar, actor
Mohit Raina, actor
Moti Lal Kemmu, playwright 
 Ram Chandra Kak, Prime Minister of Jammu and Kashmir (1945-1947)
 R. N. Kao, founder and first secretary of R&AW
 Mohan Lal Zutshi, traveler, diplomat, and author, and an important player in the Great Game.

See also

References

Bibliography
 
 
 
  
 
 
  .

Further reading

External links

 Kashmir Hindu Foundation (KHF)
 Panun Kashmir: A Homeland for Kashmiri Pandits
  'God of Small Things,' Travelogue in The Indian Express, 5 March 2006, by Arjun Razdan
 Kashmiri Pandit association of Europe

 
Ethnic groups in India
Kashmiri tribes
Social groups of Jammu and Kashmir
Kashmiri Hindus